"(You're Puttin') A Rush on Me" is a 1987 single by American singer Stephanie Mills. The single was her third number one on the Hot Black Singles chart and second number one in 1987. The single spent one week at the top spot and crossed over to the Billboard Hot 100, peaking at number eighty-five. "(You're Puttin') A Rush on Me" also peaked at number twenty-three on the dance charts.

Charts

Weekly charts

Year-end charts

References

1987 singles
Stephanie Mills songs
1987 songs
MCA Records singles
New jack swing songs